The seventh octave is the highest octave of a piano.

Using middle C (C4) as a guide, the next higher C is C5 or tenor C.  The next C is C6 or soprano high C.  The next C, C7 or double high C, is again one octave higher. C7 is eight steps away from the last note on the 88-key piano: C8.  C7 is also the highest note on most other keyboard instruments.  The seventh octave is the range of notes between C7 and C8.  It is easier for very high coloratura sopranos to sing in this octave, but some people who are capable of singing in the bass range (like singers Adam Lopez, Virgo Degan, Nicola Sedda or Dimash Kudaibergen) can do it.  While notes in the sixth octave, between soprano high C and C7, can have enough color to sound flutey or canary-like, the squeaky, whistly tones in the seventh octave help give the whistle register its name, as do  the piercing qualities of notes in this octave.

Pitch (music)